JBI may refer to:
 Badjiri language, an extinct language of Australia
 Java Business Integration
 JBI International, formerly the Jewish Braille Institute
 The Joanna Briggs Institute
 Joint Battlespace Infosphere